Vasinae, common name the vase snails or vase shells, are a taxonomic subfamily of large predatory sea snails, marine gastropod mollusks within the family Turbinellidae.

Shell description
Shells of species in this subfamily are fairly large, very thick, and heavy. The shells have low spires and have plaits on the columella.

Genera
Genera within the subfamily Vasinae include:
 Altivasum Hedley, 1914
 Enigmavasum Poppe & Tagaro, 2005
 † Fyfea Finlay & Marwick, 1937 
 Tudivasum Rosenberg & Petit, 1987
 Vasum Röding, 1798
Synonyms
 Cynodonta Schumacher, 1817: synonym of Vasum Röding, 1798
 Globivasum Abbott, 1950: synonym of Vasum Röding, 1798
 Scolymus Swainson, 1835: synonym of Vasum Röding, 1798
 Tudicula H. Adams & A. Adams, 1864: synonym of Tudivasum Rosenberg & Petit, 1987 (junior homonym of Tudicula Ryckholt, 1862)
 Volutella Perry, 1810: synonym of Vasum Röding, 1798

References

External links
 Swainson, W. (1840). A treatise on malacology or shells and shell-fish. London, Longman. viii + 419 pp
 Abbott R.T.(1950) - The Genera Xancus and Vasum in the Western Atlantic; Johnsonia v. 2 19-32
  Abbott, R. T. (1959). The family Vasidae in the Indo-Pacific. Indo-Pacific Mollusca. 1 (1): 15-32
  Bouchet, P. & Rocroi, J.-P. (2005). Classification and nomenclator of gastropod families. Malacologia. 47 (1-2): 1-397.

Turbinellidae